Octavio Darío Rodríguez Peña (born 17 September 1974) is a Uruguayan former footballer who played as a centre-back and left-back. He is currently the assistant manager of the Uruguay national team.

He is a younger brother of the footballer Héctor Rodríguez Peña.

Club career
Born in Montevideo, Rodríguez has played the majority of his club football for Peñarol, and Schalke 04. His other clubs include Sud América and Bella Vista and Toluca. He left Schalke 04 in January 2008 and returned to Peñarol.

International career
With Uruguay, Rodríguez was a participant at the 2002 World Cup and scored Uruguay's first goal of the tournament, a volley that curled into the top left corner of the goal. He occasionally wore the captain's captain's armband. He also played at the 2004 and 2007 Copa América tournaments.

Style of play
A versatile defender, he was capable of playing as a left-back or as a left-sided central defender. Strong in the air, he was a useful distraction in the opposition box at set pieces.

Career statistics

International

Scores and results list Uruguay's goal tally first, score column indicates score after each Rodríguez goal.

Honours
Schalke 04
UEFA Intertoto Cup: 2003, 2004
DFB-Ligapokal: 2005

References

External links
 
 

1974 births
Living people
Uruguayan footballers
Uruguayan expatriate footballers
C.A. Bella Vista players
Peñarol players
Deportivo Toluca F.C. players
FC Schalke 04 players
Uruguay international footballers
2002 FIFA World Cup players
2004 Copa América players
2007 Copa América players
Association football defenders
Footballers from Montevideo
Uruguayan Primera División players
Liga MX players
Bundesliga players
Expatriate footballers in Mexico
Expatriate footballers in Germany
Sud América players